Didcot Railway Centre is a railway museum and preservation engineering site in Didcot, Oxfordshire, England. The site was formerly a Great Western Railway engine shed and locomotive stabling point.

Background
The founders and commercial backers of the Great Western Railway  (GWR) supported Isambard Kingdom Brunel's scheme to develop an integrated railway and steamship service which allowed trans-Atlantic passengers and freight quicker passage between London and New York City. However, whilst backing the scheme the railway had to make a profit, and so it took a number of detours and added both mainline and branch line traffic to increase its domestic earnings. This earned the railway the nickname The Great Way Round from its detractors.

Whilst the route from London Paddington to Reading was relatively straight, the then obvious most direct route to Bristol would have taken the railway further south, thus avoiding both Didcot and Swindon. However, passenger and freight traffic both to and from Oxford and onwards to the West Midlands in part dictated a more northerly route. Also, Brunel had originally planned to cut through Savernake Forest near Marlborough, Wiltshire to Bristol, but the Marquess of Ailesbury, who owned the land, objected – having previously objected to part of the Kennet and Avon Canal running through his estate (see Bruce Tunnel). This dictated that the Oxford junction also be moved northwards, and hence via Didcot. The Great Western Railway built the first rail line through Didcot in 1839 and opened its first station in 1844.

Construction

Due to the technical operational difficulties of running and maintaining a mainline service from London to Bristol, as well as the need for servicing locomotives going to Oxford, Didcot became an obvious midpoint maintenance and stabling point. Having built a timber-framed  broad gauge shed on the original site during the railway's development west in the 1800s, in June 1932 a new steel-framed half-brick 4-road through shed, was completed by the GWR under the Loans and Guarantees Act (1929). With shed code DID, it also included a repair shop, coaling stage, sand furnace and  turntable and associated offices. During World War II, a standard steel-framed with corrugated iron-panel covered ash shelter was erected.

Operations
After World War II, the site remained virtually unchanged during the nationalised ownership of British Railways (BR), but for taking on the new code of 81E. The standard allocation of locomotives remained the same, with Halls, Dukedogs and Panniers making up the bulk of the depot's fleet.

Closure
With the replacement of steam with diesel traction under the Modernisation Plan, the shed became redundant and was closed in June 1965.

Formation and site lease
The Great Western Society (GWS) was offered the use of the former Didcot locomotive depot, taking it over in 1967. In the 1970s, the society negotiated a long-term lease with BR which was to expire in 2019. But this was subject to a six-month termination clause which could force the GWS to quit the site, and which could be operated at any point in time by lease-holder Network Rail (NR).

In an attempt to secure a long-term future for the society, in 2002 the GWS opened negotiations with NR to either purchase the site or extend the lease. In a letter dated May 2007, NR informed the GWS that they were prepared to sell the site subject to Office of Rail Regulation (ORR) approval. It had been thought the site could be subject to need as a depot, either due to: the rebuilding of Reading station; a Crossrail project depot; or the Intercity Express Programme. After expressing some concern at the slow speed of negotiations at the GWS annual meeting in September 2008, NR wrote to the GWS to advise that the site was no longer available for sale, and although a lease extension was still on offer it was still subject to the previous six-month termination clause. The GWS then wrote to their local MP Ed Vaizey, and placed any long-term development plans on hold.  Richard Croucher (Chairman of the Great Western Society) signed a new 50-year lease with Network Rail, therefore preserving the site for at least another 50 years.

Museum and railway centre

Today the GWS have developed the site, which still retains many of the original GWR buildings and features, as both a working steam locomotive and railway museum, engineering maintenance centre, and railway line offering short rides to visitors.

Access via Didcot Parkway station brings the visitor into the southern end of the site, at the start of the ramp coal wagons would take up to the coaling stage. Beyond this is the original 1932 four-road engine shed, and beyond this the original repair shed and 1988 constructed locomotive works, both of which have restricted access due to safety concerns. Beyond this lies a Ransomes & Rapier  turntable and pit, originally built for the Southern Railway and installed at Southampton Docks.

The centre regularly holds events such as steam and diesel railcar days. Members of the Great Western Society are active in the preservation of locomotives and rolling stock. Certain 'new-build' projects to create locomotives that did not escape wholesale scrapping are also undertaken at Didcot, such as the completed Firefly locomotive, a 'Saint' class (using a 'Hall' class chassis and boiler) and a 'County' class locomotive (using a 'Hall' class chassis and an LMS '8F' class boiler).

The Railway Centre is used a period film set and has featured in works including Anna Karenina, Sherlock Holmes: A Game of Shadows, and The Elephant Man.

Running lines

There are three short lengths of running track, each with a station at both ends:
Branchline: starts at a typical GWR wayside halt, named Didcot Halt, and runs north on the western edge of the site to a platform, named Burlescombe Station, at the transshipment shed. Dating from broad gauge days, the shed was used for transferring goods from broad to "narrow" (i.e. ) rolling stock and vice versa. It was moved to its present location carefully from its original site nearby.
Broad Gauge Line: the broad gauge line of  starts from the transshipment shed, and runs halfway back down the branchline. The 2005 replica GWR Firefly is housed within the shed when not running
Long-term plans include the reconstruction of the Brunel-designed building from  station on this platform.

Access

The railway centre is entirely surrounded by active railway lines and has no road connection of any kind. Public access is on foot from a subway at Didcot Parkway station, which links the centre by rail to London and much of southern and central England. Wheelchair and pram access is practically nonexistent; they have to be carried up a flight of concrete steps. Although this contravenes the Disability Discrimination Act, the Great Western Society is unable to improve it since the site is owned by Network Rail.

Collection

Steam locomotives

Diesel locomotives

Other rolling stock
The GWS has an extensive supporting collection of GWR rolling stock, including three of the GWR Super Saloons that serviced the boat train traffic to Plymouth.

Carriages

Two Broad Gauge replica carriages were also made by the GWS:

Non-passenger-carrying coaching stock

Wagons

References

External links

Official website
Listed building information:

Heritage railways in Oxfordshire
Museums in Oxfordshire
Railway museums in England
Railway depots in England
Grade II listed buildings in Oxfordshire
Railway societies
Railway Centre
1967 establishments in England